Zagaj is a settlement in the Municipality of Bistrica ob Sotli in eastern Slovenia. The area is part of the traditional region of Styria. It is now included in the Lower Sava Statistical Region; until January 2014 it was part of the Savinja Statistical Region.

References

External links
Zagaj on Geopedia

Populated places in the Municipality of Bistrica ob Sotli